Edison Luiz dos Santos (born 9 December 1985 in Osasco), also known as Tarabai, is a Brazilian football player who plays as a forward.

Career statistics

Note: "Other" includes Maltese First Division title decider (2012–13), Maltese Super Cup (2013–14), and K League Challenge promotion play-offs (2015).

References

External links 
 

1985 births
Living people
People from Osasco
Footballers from São Paulo (state)
Brazilian footballers
Brazilian expatriate footballers
Association football forwards
Rio Preto Esporte Clube players
Vittoriosa Stars F.C. players
Hibernians F.C. players
Kecskeméti TE players
Seoul E-Land FC players
K League 2 players
Al Batin FC players
Al-Raed FC players
Al-Shoulla FC players
Birkirkara F.C. players
Saudi Professional League players
Saudi First Division League players
Maltese Premier League players
Nemzeti Bajnokság I players
Expatriate footballers in Malta
Expatriate footballers in Hungary
Expatriate footballers in South Korea
Expatriate footballers in Saudi Arabia
Brazilian expatriate sportspeople in Malta
Brazilian expatriate sportspeople in Hungary
Brazilian expatriate sportspeople in South Korea
Brazilian expatriate sportspeople in Saudi Arabia